Matheus Alexandre Anastácio de Souza (born 7 April 1999), known as Matheus Alexandre is a Brazilian footballer who plays for Cuiabá, as a right back. He also can play as a defensive midfielder and a centre-back.

Career statistics

References

External links
 

1999 births
Living people
People from Marília
Brazilian footballers
Association football defenders
Campeonato Brasileiro Série A players
Campeonato Brasileiro Série B players
Marília Atlético Clube players
Associação Atlética Ponte Preta players
Sport Club Corinthians Paulista players
Associação Atlética Internacional (Limeira) players
Coritiba Foot Ball Club players
Cuiabá Esporte Clube players
Footballers from São Paulo (state)